Scion may refer to:

Arts, entertainment, and media

Fictional entities
Scion, a playable class in the game Path of Exile (2013)
Atlantean Scion, a device in the Tomb Raider video game series
Scions, an alien race in the video game Battlezone 2 (1999)
Scions, an alien race in James Goss's Torchwood novel First Born (2011)

Other uses in arts, entertainment, and media
Scion (comics), a comic book published 2000–2004 by CrossGen Comics
Scion (role-playing game)
"Scion", an episode from season 10 of the TV series Smallville
Scion Rock Fest, an annual heavy metal music festival (2009–2014)
Scion Audio/Visual, a record label of the Scion automobile marque

Brands
 Scion (automobile), a former brand of small cars by Toyota for the United States and Canada
 Scion Hotels, a brand once proposed by The Trump Organization
 Short Scion, 1930s monoplanes

Other uses
Scion (Crown Research Institute), a forest research organisation in New Zealand
Scion (grafting), in horticulture, the upper part of a combined plant
SCION (Internet architecture), a proposed redesign for the Internet

See also
Psion (disambiguation)
Sion (disambiguation)
Zion (disambiguation)